Nuʿmān ibn Thābit ibn Zūṭā ibn Marzubān (–767), commonly known by his kunya Abū Ḥanīfa, or reverently as Imam Abū Ḥanīfa by Sunni Muslims, was a Sunni Muslim theologian and jurist who became the eponymous founder of the Hanafi school of Sunni jurisprudence, which has remained the most widely practised law school in the Sunni tradition, predominating in Central Asia, Afghanistan, Iran (until the 16th century), Balkans, Russia, Circassia, Pakistan, Bangladesh, Muslims in India, Turkey, and some parts of the Arab world. He is also called al-Imām al-Aʿẓam ("The Greatest Imam") and Sirāj al-Aʾimma ("The Lamp of the Imams") by some of his Sunni followers.

Born to a Muslim family in Kufa, Abu Hanifa is known to have travelled to the Hejaz region of Arabia in his youth, where he studied in Mecca and Medina. As his career as a theologian and jurist progressed, Abu Hanifa became known for favouring the use of reason in his legal rulings (faqīh dhū raʾy) and even in his theology. Abu Hanifa's theological school is claimed to be what would later develop into the Maturidi school of Sunni theology.

Life

Family background
Abu Hanifa was born in Kufa in 80 AH, 77 AH, 70 AH, or 61 AH, during the periodof the Umayyad Caliphate. Many historians choose the latest date of birth, 80 AH. But Mohammad Zahid Al-Kawthari, adjunct to the office of the last Shaykh Al-Islam of the Ottoman Empire, wrote that 70 AH as the date of his birth is supported by two considerations. Firstly, Mohammad Ibn Makhlad Al-Attar considered the narration of Abu Hanifa’s son, Hammad, from Imam Malik Ibn Anas to be an example of an older man's narration rather than a younger man. Secondly, Abu Hanifa was concerned with who should succeed Ibrahim Al-Nakhai after his death in 96 AH. Abu Hanifa's concern about the succession would only have arisen if Abu Hanifa was older than 19, since it is considered that Abu Hanifa only took his religious studies seriously after he was about 19. If Abu Hanifa was born in 80 AH, Abu Hanifa would have been 16 at the time of Al-Nakhai's death. 

Abu Hanifa is generally accepted to be of Persian ancestry, although some scholars including Wink consider him to be of Jat origin instead. his grandfather, Zūtā, may have been captured by Muslim troops in Kabul and sold as a slave in Kufa. There, he may have been purchased and freed by an Arab tribesman of the Taymallah, a branch of the Banu Bakr. Zūtā and his progeny thereafter would have become clients (mawali) of the Taymallah, hence the sporadic references to Abu Hanifa as 'al-Taymi'. According to Abu Hanifa's grandson Ismail, however, his lineage went back to free Persians who had never been held as slaves. He called Abu Hanifa's great-grandfather "al-Marzuban", which is an arabicised form of the Sasanian military office of marzban, held by governors of the frontier provinces of the Sasanian realm.

Early life and scholarship
There is scant biographical information about Abu Hanifa. It is generally known that he worked a producer and seller of "khazz", a type of silk clothing material. He attended lectures on jurisprudence conducted by the Kufan scholar Hammad ibn Abi Sulayman (d. 737). He also possibly learnt jurisprudence (fiqh) from the Meccan scholar Ata ibn Abi Rabah (d. ) while on Hajj.

When Hammad died, Abu Hanifa succeeded him as the principal authority on Islamic law in Kufa and the chief representative of the Kufan school of jurisprudence. Abu Hanifa gradually gained influence as an authority on legal questions, founding a moderate rationalist school of Islamic jurisprudence that was named after him.

Adulthood and death

In 763, al-Mansur, the Abbasid caliph offered Abu Hanifa the post of qadi al-qudat (chief judge of the state), but he declined the offer, choosing to remain independent. His student Abu Yusuf was later appointed to the post by Caliph Harun al-Rashid.

In his reply to al-Mansur, Abu Hanifa said that he was not fit for the post. Al-Mansur, who had his own ideas and reasons for offering the post, lost his temper and accused Abu Hanifa of lying.

"If I am lying," Abu Hanifa responded, "then my statement is doubly correct. How can you appoint a liar to the exalted post of a Qadi (Chief Judge)?"

Incensed by this reply, al-Mansur had Abu Hanifa arrested, locked in prison and tortured. It was said that once in prison he was never fed nor cared for. Even in prison, the jurist continued to teach those who were permitted to visit him.

On 15 Rajab 150, (15 August 767) Abu Hanifa died in prison. The cause of his death is not clear, as it was said by some that Abu Hanifa issued a legal opinion for bearing arms against al-Mansur, so al-Mansur had him poisoned. His fellow prisoner and founder of Karaite Judaism, Anan ben David, was said to have received life-saving counsel from Abu Hanifa. It was said that so many people attended his funeral that the funeral service was repeated six times for the more than 50,000 people who had massed before he was actually buried. The historian al-Khatib said that for a full 20 days people performed funeral prayers for him. Many years later, the Abu Hanifa Mosque was built in the Adhamiyah neighbourhood of Baghdad. Abu Hanifa also supported the cause of Zayd ibn Ali and Ibrahim al Qamar, both Alid Zaydi Imams.

The structures of the tombs of Abu Hanifa and Abdul Qadir Gilani were destroyed by Shah Ismail of the Safavid Empire in 1508. In 1533, the Ottomans conquered Baghdad and rebuilt the tombs of Abu Hanifa and Abdul Qadir, as well as other Sunni sites.

Students 
Yusuf ibn Abd al-Rahman al-Mizzi listed 97 hadith scholars who were his students. Most of them went on to be hadith scholars, and their narrated hadiths were compiled in the Sahih al-Bukhari, Sahih Muslim and other books of hadith. Imām Badr al-Din al-Ayni included another 260 students who studied Hadith and Fiqh with Abu Hanifa.

His most famous students were Imām Abu Yusuf, who served as the first chief justice in the Muslim world, and Imām Muhammad al-Shaybani, who was the teacher of the Shafi‘i school of jurisprudence founder, Imām Al-Shafi‘i. His other students included:

 Abdullah ibn Mubarak
 Abu Nuāim Fadl Ibn Dukain
 Malik bin Mighwal
 Dawood Taa’ee
 Mandil bin Ali
 Qaasim bin Ma’n
 Hayyaaj bin Bistaam
 Hushaym bin Basheer Sulami
 Fudhayl bin Iyaadh
 Ali bin Tibyaan
 Wakee bin Jarrah
 Amr bin Maymoon
 Abu Ismah
 Zuhayr bin Mu’aawiyah
 Aafiyah bin Yazeed

Sources and methodology 
The sources from which Abu Hanifa derived Islamic law, in order of importance and preference, were: the Qur'an, the authentic narrations of the Muslim prophet Muhammad (known as hadith), consensus of the Muslim community (ijma), analogical reasoning (qiyas), juristic discretion (istihsan) and the customs of the local population enacting Muslim laws (urf). The development of analogical reason and the scope and boundaries by which it may be used was recognized by the majority of Muslim jurists, but its establishment as a legal tool was the result of the Hanafi school. While it was likely used by some of his teachers, Abu Hanifa is regarded by modern scholarship as the first to formally adopt and institute analogical reason as a part of Islamic law.

As the fourth Caliph, Ali had transferred the Islamic capital to Kufa, and many of the first generation of Muslims had settled there. The Hanafi school of law based many of its rulings on the prophetic tradition as transmitted by those first generation Muslims residing in Iraq. Thus, the Hanafi school came to be known as the Kufan or Iraqi school. Ali and Abdullah, son of Masud helped form much of the base of the school, as well as other personalities from the direct relatives (or Ahli-ll-Bayṫ) of Moḥammad from whom Abu Hanifa had studied such as Muhammad al-Baqir. Many jurists and historians had reportedly lived in Kufa, including one of Abu Hanifa's main teachers, Hammad ibn Abi Sulayman.

Generational status

Abu Hanifa is regarded by some authorities as one of the Tabi‘un, the generation after the Sahaba, who were the companions of the Islamic prophet, Muhammad. This is based on reports that he met at least four Sahaba including Anas ibn Malik, with some even reporting that he transmitted Hadith from him and other companions of Muhammad. Others take the view that Abu Hanifa only saw around half a dozen companions, possibly at a young age, and did not directly narrate hadith from them.

Abu Hanifa was born at least 60 years after the death of Muhammad, but during the time of the first generation of Muslims, some of whom lived on until Abu Hanifa's youth. Anas ibn Malik, Muhammad's personal attendant, died in 93 AH and another companion, Abul Tufail Amir bin Wathilah, died in 100 AH, when Abu Hanifa was at least 20 years old. The author of al-Khairat al-Hisan collected information from books of biographies and cited the names of Muslims of the first generation from whom it was reported that the Abu Hanifa had transmitted hadith. He counted 16 of them, including Anas ibn Malik, Jabir ibn Abd-Allah and Sahl ibn Sa'd.

Reception

He was highly regarded across the various fields of sacred knowledge and significantly influenced the development of Muslim theology. During his lifetime, he was acknowledged as a jurist of the highest calibre.

Outside of his scholarly achievements, Abu Hanifa is popularly known amongst Sunni Muslims as a man of the highest personal qualities:  a performer of good works, remarkable for his self-denial, humble spirit, devotion and pious awe of God.

His tomb, surmounted by a dome erected by admirers in 1066 is still a shrine for pilgrims. It was restored in 1535 by Suleiman the Magnificent after the Ottoman conquest of Baghdad.

The honorific title al-Imam al-A'zam ("the greatest leader") has been granted to him in many communities where his legal theory is followed. According to John Esposito, 45% of all Muslims follow the Hanafi school.

Abu Hanifa also had his critics. The Zahiri scholar Ibn Hazm quoted Sufyan ibn `Uyaynah: "[T]he affairs of men were in harmony until they were changed by Abù Hanìfa in Kùfa, al-Batti in Basra and Màlik in Medina". Early Muslim jurist Hammad ibn Salamah once related a story about a highway robber who posed as an old man to hide his identity; he then remarked that were the robber still alive he would be a follower of Abu Hanifa.

Connection with the family of Muhammad 

As with Malik ibn Anas (who was a teacher of Imam al-Shafi'i, who in turn was a teacher of Sunni Imam Ahmad ibn Hanbal), Imam Abu Hanifa was a student of Ja'far al-Sadiq, who was a descendant of the Islamic Nabi (Prophet) Muhammad. Thus all of the four great Imams of Sunni Fiqh are connected to Ja'far from the Bayt (Household) of Muhammad, whether directly or indirectly.

In one hadith, Abu Hanifa once said about Imam Ja'far: "I have not seen anyone with more knowledge than Ja'far ibn Muhammad." However, in another hadith, Abu Hanifa said: "I met with Zayd (Ja'far's uncle) and I never saw in his generation a person more knowledgeable, as quick a thinker, or more eloquent than he was."

Opposition to deviations in belief
Imam Abu Hanifa was quoted as saying that Jahm ibn Safwan (d. 128/745) went so far in his denial of anthropomorphism (Tashbih) as to declare that 'God is not something (Allah laysa bi shay')'. Muqatil ibn Sulayman (d. 150/767), likened God to His creatures.

Al-Khatib al-Baghdadi narrated in his Tarikh Baghdad (History of Baghdad) that Imam Abu Hanifa said:

Works

Confusion regarding Al-Fiqh Al-Akbar
The attribution of Al-Fiqh Al-Akbar to Aby Hanifa has been disputed by A.J. Wensick as well as by Zubair Ali Zai.

Other scholars have agreed that Abu Hanifa was the author including Muhammad Zahid Al-Kawthari, al-Bazdawi, and Abd al-Aziz al-Bukhari. The scholar, Ibn Abil-'Izz Al-Hanafi attributes the book to Abu Hanifa.

Scholars such as Mufti Abdur-Rahman have pointed out that the book being brought into question by Wensick is actually another work by Abu Hanifa called: Al-Fiqh Al-Absat.

Citations

Sources

Further reading
 
 
 Abdur-Rahman ibn Yusuf, Imam Abu Hanifa's Al-Fiqh Al-Akbar Explained

Online
 Abū Ḥanīfah: Muslim jurist and theologian, in Encyclopædia Britannica Online, by Zafar Ishaq Ansari, The Editors of Encyclopaedia Britannica, Thinley Kalsang Bhutia, Surabhi Sinha and Adam Zeidan

External links

 The Life of Imam Abu Hanifa Biography at Lost Islamic History.
 Imam Abu Hanifa by Jamil Ahmad.
 Al-Wasiyyah of Imam Abu Hanifah Translated into English by Shaykh Imam Tahir Mahmood al-Kiani.
 Book on Imam e Azam Abu Hanifa (Urdu)
 Abu Hanifa on Muslim heritage
 Imām Abū Ḥanīfah By Shiekh G. F. Haddad
 Some teachers and students of Imam Abu Hanifa

699 births
767 deaths
8th-century Arabic writers
8th-century Iranian people
Deaths by poisoning
 
Mujaddid
People from Kabul
People from Kufa
People from Najaf Province
Iranian scholars
Quranic exegesis scholars
Sunni fiqh scholars
Sunni imams
Sunni Muslim scholars of Islam
Taba‘ at-Tabi‘in
Tabi‘un
Critics of atheism
8th-century Muslim theologians
Persian Sunni Muslim scholars of Islam